The Glenorchy District Football Club is an Australian rules football club currently playing in the Tasmanian State League and the Southern Football League  in Tasmania, Australia.

History
The club is nicknamed the Magpies after its black and white playing strip, and was originally known as New Town Football Club (wearing a green and white strip) when it started out as a member of the Tasmanian Football League in 1919.

New Town changed its name to Glenorchy in 1957 after absorbing the already established club Glenorchy Rovers and relocated its headquarters to KGV Oval at Glenorchy in Hobart's northern suburbs in the same year, playing its first match at the venue on 4 May 1957 against Hobart. It remains there to this day. After the death of the Tasmanian Football League in December 2000, the club was temporarily without a league to play in.

After some political maneuvering within football circles, Glenorchy were admitted to the Southern Football League, but at a high price, with the club being forced, as a condition of entry to the League, to give up its black and white playing strip, and its Magpies emblem as it clashed with former Southern Amateur club Claremont Magpies, who were already a member of the SFL.

Glenorchy announced in early 2001 that they would adopt a new green, black & white playing uniform, and be known as the "Glenorchy Storm". This was not popular with fans who drifted away from the club, and its membership and support base decreased rapidly.

There was to be considerable rejoicing amongst its fans in 2004, after persistent pressure from the club, and the fact that Claremont were now playing in the SFL Regional League, which resulted in Glenorchy being granted the return of its black and white strip, and the Magpie emblem.

Statistics

Club record attendance
24,968: 1979 TFL Grand Final vs Clarence Roos at North Hobart Oval.

Club record attendance (Home & Away)
8,480 + approx. 2000 non-paying juniors: 2011 TSL Round 1 vs Clarence Roos at KGV Oval

Club record score
TFL 34.21 (225) vs Hobart 18.14 (122) at KGV Oval Round 22, 1983.

Senior coaches
}

Glenorchy District Football Club Team of the Century: 1919–2000
Backline: Roland Curley, Roy Witzerman, Alan Leitch.
Half-back line: Trevor Sprigg, Barry Strange, Robbie Dykes.
 Centre line: Michael Styles (Capt), Neil Conlan, Ben Atkin.
 Half-forward line: John Klug, Max Griffiths, David Pearce.
 Forward line: Danny Ling, Peter Hudson, Gary Linton.
 Ruck: Jack Rough, Rex Garwood, Ron Marney.
 Interchange: John Chick, Matthew Mansfield, Kevin Morgan, Denis Lester, Kevin Baker, Adrian Fletcher, Max McMahon.

VFL/AFLPlayers
Notable players that went on the play in the VFL/AFL who started at Glenorchy:

 Ben Brown
 Jimmy Webster
 Ryan Harwood
 Brodie Moles
 Aaron Cornelius
 Aaron Joseph
 Simon Wiggins
 Peter Street
 Brodie Holland
 Justin Wood
 Ben Beams
 Daryn Cresswell
 John Klug
 Adrian Fletcher
 Andy Lovell
 Matthew Mansfield
 Shane Fell
 Rodney Eade
 Wayne Fox
 Darryl Sutton
 Graham Fox

Players who came to Glenorchy post-career:

 Peter Hudson
 Jason Akermanis
 Shayne Stevenson
 Darren Kappler
 Robert Groenewegen
 Shane Loveless
 Bill Picken
 Max McMahon 
 Ian Bremner

Honours

Club
 Tasmanian Football League
Premiers (15): 1935, 1948, 1949, 1951, 1953, 1955, 1956, 1958, 1965, 1975, 1983, 1985, 1986, 1999, 2016, 2018 (TSLW)
 Runners up (19): 1923, 1926, 1946, 1950, 1954, 1957, 1961, 1966, 1967, 1976, 1977, 1978, 1979, 1980, 1982, 1984, 1987, 1988, 2009, 2015, 2017(TSLW)
 Southern Football League
 Premiers (2): 2007, 2008
 Runners up (2): 2001, 2006
 Tasmanian State Premiership (5): 1948, 1953, 1956, 1965, 1975

Individual

William Leitch Medallists
(Best and fairest player – TFL and SFL premier senior football)
 1951  – Rex Garwood
 1967 - Neville Johnston 
 1975 – Trevor Sprigg
 1978 – Peter Hudson
 1979 – Peter Hudson
 1980 – Gary Linton
 1988 – Adrian Fletcher
 1999 – Ben Atkin
 2005 – David Newitt
 2006 – Jesse Crouch
 2008 – Shane Piuselli

George Watt Medallists
(Best and fairest player – TFL reserves football)
 1963 – Dal Johnson
 1968 – W. Hayes
 1973 – P. Lynsky (tied)
 1981 – Wayne Olding
 1987 – Mark Horner (three way tie)
 1988 – Steven Hay
 2006 – Clinton French

V. A. Geard Medallists
(Best and fairest player – TFL thirds football)
 1950 – J.Chick
 1956 – D. Cranfield
 1974 – L. Berwick
 1981 – N. Jeffrey

D. R. Plaister Medallists
(Best and fairest – TFL fourths football)
 1978 – Jamie Woolley
 1991 – Craig Grace

Lefroy Medallists
(Best and fairest – Tasmanian state team)
 1965 – M. McMahon (tied)
 1979 – Darryl Sutton
 1986 – David Pearce
 2009 – Shane Piuselli (tied)
2019 - Aiden Grace

Horrie Gorringe Medallists
(Best on field in the Premier League Grand Final)
 2007 – Brad Curran
 2008 – Damian McIver

Tassie Medalists
 2012 – Jaye Bowden
 2015 – Jaye Bowden
 2016 – Jaye Bowden

References

External links

 AFL Tasmania
 Southern Football League Official Website
 Glenorchy Magpies Official Website

Australian rules football clubs in Tasmania
Australian rules football clubs established in 1919
1919 establishments in Australia
Tasmanian Football League clubs
Sport in Hobart
Glenorchy, Tasmania